Breton sauce (fr. sauce bretonne) is a French compound sauce consisting of a velouté base with julienned onion, leeks, celery heart and mushrooms, mounted with butter and cream. It has been referred to as a brown version of sauce soubise, which has as its base a béchamel sauce.

References

Brown sauces
French sauces